Numeer better known by his stage  mononymous name Sufi (stylised Sufi Numeer) and ROOTS is an Indian rapper, songwriter and music producer.

Early life 
He was born in North western India.

Nothing much is known about his early life in his home town. Sufi started his career after dropping out from college in early 2010, but by the end of 2014 he took to music and song writing and shifted to Bangalore. At the end of 2014 time he got his first song out. Over the next few months his debut song universal pain (A nearly autobiographical story of his life as a youngster adapting to new life in changing world).

Music career 
His early career started as a fashion model but by early 2015 his independent debut album, Trail Blazer was published on VEVO and kicked off well following second album, Musafir - The Journey begins.

2012-2015 
In 2015 Sufi has published songs and music actively and participated in many concerts and music festivals including Eastern music Festival Patna , Bangalore youth festival.

Discography

Albums

Singles Music

Singles 

 "Universal Pain" – Sufi Numeer ft Ravi demon
 "Trail Blazer theme track " – Sufi Numeer
 "Broken Memories" – Sufi Numeer ft Hick Sisters
 "Musafir Hai Hum Tum" – Sufi Numeer ft. Ravi Demon
 "Musafir Theme track" - Ravi demon ft Sufi numeer nabi
 "If i lost you" – Sufi numeer nabi

References

External links
 

Living people
Indian rappers
Singers from Bangalore
Year of birth missing (living people)